Riverkeeper is a non-profit environmental organization dedicated to the protection of the Hudson River and its tributaries, as well as the watersheds that provide New York City with its drinking water. It started out as the Hudson River Fisherman's Association (HRFA) in 1966. In 1986, the group officially changed its name to Riverkeeper, making it the first "keeper" group to be founded. In 1999, the Waterkeeper Alliance was created as an umbrella organization to unite and support "keeper" organizations.  

Riverkeeper's mission is "to protect the environmental, recreational and commercial integrity of the Hudson River and its tributaries, and safeguard the drinking water of nine million New York City and Hudson Valley residents." Tracy Brown is president of the organization.

The organization has lobbied against nuclear power and hydropower.

History 

The Hudson Valley has long been considered the birthplace of the modern American environmental movement. In the 1960s a small group of scientists, fishermen and concerned citizens led by Robert H. Boyle, author of The Hudson River, A Natural and Unnatural History and a senior writer at Sports Illustrated, were determined to reverse the decline of the then-polluted Hudson River by confronting the polluters through advocacy and citizen law enforcement.

In 1983, HRFA hired John Cronin. 

In 2000, eight of the 22 members of Riverkeeper's board resigned after Kennedy insisted on rehiring William Wegner, a scientist whom the organization's then-president, Boyle, had fired as soon as he had learned Wegner had been hired six months earlier. In 1995, Wegner had been convicted of smuggling rare bird eggs from Australia and had also pled guilty to tax evasion. Boyle and the board members who resigned believed it was not right for an environmental organization to hire someone convicted of environmental crimes, especially since critics would not hesitate to publicize that fact to gain a publicity advantage. Treasurer John Fry, who also resigned, felt it would hurt the organization's fundraising. Boyle was also further displeased that Kennedy had made an employment decision, since that was solely his responsibility within the organization. Kennedy, who had hired Wegner to work for him personally after Boyle had fired him, said Wegner had done "terrific work" for Riverkeeper and no one, even those who had resigned over the hiring, disputed that. "We all make mistakes in our lives," he told The New York Times. "Where would any of us be if we didn't get a second chance?" As of 2017 Wegner remains employed by Riverkeeper.

Opposition to nuclear power 

Riverkeeper has advocated for the closure of the Indian Point nuclear power plant. Riverkeeper argued that the power plant killed fish by taking in river water for cooling and that the power plant could cause "apocalyptic damage" if attacked by terrorists. Riverkeeper argued that the electricity provided by Indian Point could be fully replaced by renewable energy. After the closure, carbon emissions from electricity generation in New York state increased by 37% and the share of fossil fuel energy  in the electric grid increased by 90%.

Opposition to hydropower 
In 2022, Riverkeeper called on New York to reject a $3 billion clean energy plan that would have supplied New York City with hydropower and lessened New York's reliance on fossil fuels. Riverkeeper opposed the hydropower plan, saying "This is not emission-free power." Riverkeeper's position was in stark contrast with many other environmental and clean-energy advocates who argued that the plan was needed to shift the region towards greener energy. Riverkeeper argued that construction of hydropower dams have adverse environment effects, but the hydropower station that New York was set to use had already been constructed which meant that most of the upfront environmental impact had already occurred.

See also

List of environmental and conservation organizations in the United States

References

Notes

Bibliography 
 Cronin, John Jr., and Robert F. Kennedy. (1999). The Riverkeepers: Two Activists Fight to Reclaim Our Environment as a Basic Human Right. New York: Simon and Schuster. 
 Gottlieb, Robert. (2005). Forcing the Spring: the Transformation of the American Environmental Movement. Washington D.C.: Island Press.
 Kennedy, Robert F. Jr. (2000). "Risk, Democracy, and the Environment". In Gail Charnley, John D. Graham, Robert F. Kennedy, Jr., and Jason Shogren, "1998 Annual Meeting Plenary Session: Assessing and Managing Risks in a Democratic Society," Risk Analysis 20(3):301-316.

External links 
 Riverkeeper website
 Waterkeeper Alliance website
 A River Keeper’s View of Climate Change
 Beacon Institute for Rivers and Estuaries

Hudson River
Organizations established in 1966
Water pollution in the United States
Nature conservation organizations based in the United States
Community organizations
Fishing and the environment
Environmental issues in New York (state)
Environmental law in the United States
Water organizations in the United States
Environmental organizations based in New York (state)